Krushelnytskyi or Krushelnytsky (Ukrainian: Крушельницький) is a Ukrainian masculine surname, its feminine counterpart is Krushelnytska. The Polish variant of this surname is Kruszelnicki (masculine) or Kruszelnicka (feminine). It may refer to:

Amvrosiy Krushelnytskyi (born 1841), Ukrainian Greek Catholic priest, public figure, choral conductor; the father of Solomiya, Hanna, Anton, Emiliya, Osypa:
Anton Krushelnytskyi (born 1866), Ukrainian singer (bass), conductor, collector of folklore
Solomiya Krushelnytska (born 1872), Ukrainian soprano, considered to be one of the brightest opera stars of the first half of the 20th century
Emiliya Krushelnytska (born 1875), Ukrainian folklorist, singer and conductor
Hanna Krushelnytska (born 1887), Ukrainian opera singer (soprano)
Antin Krushelnytskyi (1878–1937), Ukrainian writer and literary critic
Marian Krushelnytsky (1897–1963), Ukrainian actor and theater director
Ivan Krushelnytsky (1905–1934), Ukrainian poet, graphic artist, and art critic, son of Antin Krushelnytskyi
Larysa Krushelnytska (1928-2017), Ukrainian archaeologist
Mike Krushelnyski (born 1960), Canadian hockey player

See also
Krushelnitskiy

References

Ukrainian-language surnames